Nassarius samiae is a species of sea snail, a marine gastropod mollusc in the family Nassariidae, the Nassa mud snails or dog whelks.

Description
The shell grows to a length of 20 mm.

Distribution
This marine species occurs off the Philippines.

References

 Bouchet, P.; Fontaine, B. (2009). List of new marine species described between 2002–2006. Census of Marine Life.

External links
 

Nassariidae
Gastropods described in 2006